Pablo Freitas Cardoso Mello or simply Pablo (born May 5, 1987 in Presidente Prudente), is a Brazilian striker. He currently plays for Luverdense.

Titles
São Paulo
 Brazilian League: 1
 2008

See also
Football in Brazil
List of football clubs in Brazil

References

External links
Sambafoot profile

1987 births
Living people
People from Presidente Prudente, São Paulo
Brazilian footballers
Brazilian expatriate footballers
São Paulo FC players
Association football midfielders
Footballers from São Paulo (state)